Rossana Rodríguez Sanchez (born November 13, 1978) is a Chicago politician and community organizer. She is the alderwoman of Chicago's 33rd ward, having taken office as a member of the Chicago City Council in May 2019. She won election to that office after defeating incumbent Deb Mell in the 2019 Chicago aldermanic elections. She is a member of the Democratic Socialists of America.

Early life, education, and career 
Rodriguez-Sanchez was born in Humacao, Puerto Rico in 1978. Her father was a community organizer, and Rodriguez-Sanchez cites attending a protest against the Roosevelt Roads Naval Station's practice of diverting water from her community as one of her earliest moments of political consciousness. She received a Bachelor’s in Theater Education from the University of Puerto Rico at Río Piedras in 2003, as well as a Master’s in Applied Theater from the University of Manchester in 2007.

Rodriguez-Sanchez worked as a drama teacher in Puerto Rico before austerity cuts to public education on the island led her to move to Albany Park, Chicago and accept the position of Resident Director of the Albany Park Theater Project. While working with APTP to create community theater that reflected the daily struggles of people in working-class, largely immigrant community, Rodriguez-Sanchez became involved with the Immigrant Youth Justice League, an organization led by undocumented youth to combat deportations.

Chicago City Council

2019 campaign 
After announcing her intention to run for 33rd Ward Alderman in May 2018, Rodriguez-Sanchez soon drew comparisons to Alexandria Ocasio-Cortez, a fellow Democratic Socialists of America member of Puerto Rican heritage who won a U.S. House Democratic primary election in June 2018 as a heavy underdog. Rodriguez-Sanchez placed first in the February 26, 2019 general election with 42.1% of the vote, advancing to a head-to-head runoff with the incumbent Deb Mell. She then won the April 2, 2019 runoff election by 13 votes, ending nearly 44 years of Mell family control of the 33rd Ward seat.

Aldermanic career 
Rodriguez Sanchez assumed office as a member of Chicago City Council on May 20, 2019, and is a member of the Socialist, Progressive Reform, and Latino Caucuses.

In July 2019, in response to President Donald Trump's threats of U.S. Immigration and Customs Enforcement raids against undocumented immigrants in major U.S. cites, the offices of Rodriguez Sanchez and her colleague Carlos Ramirez-Rosa organized neighborhood defense brigades to patrol Albany Park in order to monitor ICE activity and disseminate know-your-rights information. Rodriguez Sanchez would later sponsor legislation to close loopholes in Chicago's sanctuary city ordinance, and the strengthened protections were signed into law in February 2021.

In November 2019, Rodriguez Sanchez was one of eleven aldermen to vote against Mayor Lori Lightfoot's first budget. She joined all five other members of the Socialist Caucus in signing a letter to Lightfoot which criticized her budget for "an over-reliance on property taxes" and "regressive funding models" that are "burdensome to our working-class citizens, while giving the wealthy and large corporations a pass." In November 2020, Rodriguez Sanchez again voted against Mayor Lightfoot's budget proposal which included a $94 million property tax hike and a provision instituting future property tax increases tied to the rate of inflation.

After the Supreme Court of the United States ruled in Dobbs v. Jackson Women's Health Organization to overrule Roe v. Wade and Planned Parenthood v. Casey, Rodriguez Sanchez introduced the Bodily Autonomy Sanctuary City Ordinance. The ordinance, which was passed into law in September 2022, prohibits the Chicago Police Department and all other city agencies from cooperating with criminal investigations launched by state or federal authorities targeting women who travel to Chicago seeking abortions and other reproductive healthcare. The law also protects "those seeking gender-affirming care in Chicago, medical providers who treat those patients and others who help those patients, such as by providing information, transportation and housing."

Electoral history

See also
List of Democratic Socialists of America who have held office in the United States

References

External links 
 Official campaign website

1978 births
21st-century American politicians
21st-century American women politicians
Alumni of the University of Manchester
American politicians of Puerto Rican descent
Puerto Rican people in Illinois politics
Chicago City Council members
Hispanic and Latino American women in politics
Living people
Democratic Socialists of America politicians from Illinois
People from Humacao, Puerto Rico
University of Puerto Rico, Río Piedras Campus alumni
Women city councillors in Illinois
Hispanic and Latino American city council members